Damion Dietz is an American writer and film director known for his underground/indie films.

Background
In 1990, Dietz appeared as an actor in Welcome Home, Roxy Carmichael, starring Winona Ryder and Jeff Daniels.

A graduate (1992) of the School of Cinematic Arts at the University of Southern California. Dietz' debut feature film Fag Hag (1998), a politically incorrect, low-budget satire for Troma Entertainment, described as "a punk, underground trash cinema classic" (New York Post / Page Six), "a savagely funny, deranged comedy of manners" (Chicago Tribune), and "rollicking, trashy and clever" (Variety) stars Dietz, Stephanie Orff and features Wil Wheaton.

Dietz' subsequent films: Neverland (2003), a surreal and modern retelling of the classic J.M. Barrie play Peter Pan, Beverly Kills (2005), a campy farce about a terrorist cult of failed Hollywood actors, Love Life (2006), a melodrama about the marriage of convenience between a closeted former athlete and his lesbian wife, which premiered at the Frameline Film Festival in San Francisco and was selected as the benefit film for the Human Rights Campaign, and Dog Tags (2008), starring Academy Award nominee Candy Clark.

Dietz is a member of Writers Guild of America, West (WGAw).

Awards
2003: Director Damion Dietz won Q Award at Fort Worth Gay and Lesbian International Film Festival for his film Neverland
2003: Dietz also won a Jury Award at the Dances With Films festival for the same film

Filmography

Director
1998: Fag Hag (Troma Entertainment)
2003: Neverland (Water Bearer Films) 
2005: Beverly Kills (TLA Releasing)
2006: Love Life (Water Bearer Films)
2008: Dog Tags (TLA Releasing)
2019: Bestie - Bhad Bhabie feat. Kodak Black (music video - Atlantic Records)

Writer
1998: Fag Hag
2003: Neverland
2005: Beverly Kills
2006: Love Life
2008: Dog Tags

Producer
1998: Fag Hag (producer)
2003: Neverland (producer)
2005: Beverly Kills (producer)
2006: Love Life (executive producer)

Actor
1990: Welcome Home, Roxy Carmichael as Whipped Cream Boy
1998: Fag Hag as Scott 'Bushey' Bushey

References

External links
Official Site

Living people
Year of birth missing (living people)
Place of birth missing (living people)
American film directors
LGBT film directors
USC School of Cinematic Arts alumni
21st-century LGBT people